Sailing at the 2007 Southeast Asian Games took place at the Ocean Marina Yacht Club and Jomtien Beach in Thailand. Seventeen gold medals were contested from 8 December 2007 to 14 December 2007.

Medal table

Medalists

Windsurfing

Events

Farr Platu 25

Formula Windsurfing Men's

Hobie 16 Men's

International 420 Men's

International 420 Women's

International 470 Men's

International 470 Women's

Laser Men's

Laser Radial Open

Mistral One Design (Youth)

Mistral One Design Heavy Weight

Mistral One Design Light Weight

Olympic Class Neil Pryde RX:S Men's

Optimist Boy's

Optimist Girl's

Optimist Team Racing

Super Mod Men's

External links
Southeast Asian Games Official Website

2007 Southeast Asian Games events
Southeast Asian Games
2007
Sailing competitions in Thailand